Chungakkunnu is a small town in Kannur district of Kerala State, India. It is located on the bank of river Bavali between Kelakam town and Hindu Pilgrim center Kottiyoor. Chungakkunnu was a famous place for settlement during Malabar Migration. More than 2000 migrated families still live here. And it is well known for its timber merchants. Most of the people depend on agriculture for their livelihood. Rubber, Coconut, Cashew, and Black pepper are main crops cultivated here.

Palukachi mala,  a scenic and picturesque tourist attraction for Trekking, has its entry at this town.

Tourist attractions 
The following destinations are nearby
 Palukachi Mala, one of the highest peaks in Kannur district.
 Bethel Garden Chungakkunnu
 Kottiyoor Temple
 Palchuram waterfalls 
 Fathima Matha Church
 Kottiyoor Wildlife Sanctuary
 Aralam Wildlife Sanctuary
 Palchuram pass to Wayanad

Education

Schools near to Chungakkunnu 

 Govt. Upper Primary School Chungakkunnu
 St. Mark L P School, Chungakkunnu
 Thalakkani Govt. UP School
 NSS KUP School Kottiyoor
 SN Lower Primary School Kottiyoor
 Ambayathode LP School
 IJM Higher Secondary school, Kottiyoor
 St. Thomas Higher Secondary School, Kelakam
 MGM (CBSC) High school Kelakam, India.
 Little Flower English Medium High school Kelakam

Health 
St. Camillus Hospital, Chungakkunnu
St. Mary's Clinic, Chungakkunnu
Nethravathi Clinic, Chungakkunnu
Govt. Ayurveda Dispensary, Chungakkunnu
Govt. Veterinary Hospital, Chungakkunnu

Banks 
Kottiyoor Service Co-Operative Bank, Chungakkunnu Branch
Vanitha co-Operative Bank, Chungakkunnu
Abiyo Finance

References

Villages in Kannur district